Frederick Arthur Walters (1849–1931) was a Scottish architect working in the Victorian and Edwardian eras, notable for his Roman Catholic churches.

Life

Walters was born on 5 February 1849 at 6 South Terrace, Brompton, London, the son of the architect Frederick Page Walters—with whom he served as an articled clerk for three years.

After working in the office of George Goldie for nine years, he formed his own architectural practice in 1878, taking his son, John Edward Walters, into partnership in 1924.

Walters, a Roman Catholic, was responsible for more than fifty Roman Catholic Churches, including Buckfast Abbey and Ealing Abbey. He also designed the seminary building at St. John's Seminary (Wonersh), which is on the statutory list of buildings of architectural and historical importance.

Walters died on 3 December 1931 at St Mildred's, Ewell.

Works

References

Bibliography
Architectural & historic review of churches in the Roman Catholic diocese of Arundel & Brighton (Teresa Sladen & Nicholas Antram, 2005)

1849 births
1931 deaths
Architects from London
Architects of Roman Catholic churches